Plains Miwok, also known as Valley Miwok, was one of the Miwok languages spoken in central California by the Plains Miwok people.  It was spoken in the deltas of the San Joaquin and Cosumnes Rivers. Plains Miwok was once one of the most populous Miwok languages. All of the population has shifted to English.

Phonology

Allophones of /b tʃ ɡ n s/ include [β ts ɣ ŋ ʂ].

References

 Callaghan, Catherine A. Plains Miwok Dictionary. University of California Publications in Linguistics, vol. 105. Berkeley: University of California Press, 1984.
 Plains Miwok Indians. "Rodriguez-Nieto Guide" Sound Recordings (California Indian Library Collections), LA008. Berkeley: California Indian Library Collections, 1993. "Sound recordings reproduced from the Language Archive sound recordings at the Language Laboratory, University of California, Berkeley".

External links 

Plains Miwok at the Survey of California and Other Indian Languages
Plains Miwok, California Language Archive
Plains Miwok basic lexicon at the Global Lexicostatistical Database
OLAC resources in and about the Plains Miwok language

Miwok
Utian languages
Extinct languages of North America